Kunětice is a municipality and village in Pardubice District in the Pardubice Region of the Czech Republic. It has about 400 inhabitants.

Geography
It is situated on the right bank of the Elbe river. It lies in a flat landscape of the East Elbe Table lowland below the Kunětice Mountain, which lies outside the municipality.

References

External links

Villages in Pardubice District